Seymour Bybuss is the stage name of Ben Browton of Leamington Spa, England, during the period when he was the singer for the punk rock band The Shapes.  Since that time, he has concentrated on different media such as music, sculpture, gender role performance art with his alter ego "Ben The Wendy".  He could be seen as the cycling art critic nun "Sister Bendy" on the alternative Channel 4 arts programme Eurotrash, and was last seen fronting his own musical collective The Ambassadors of Plush.

In 2006 he moved to Hastings, East Sussex, where he now runs a shop/gallery +PLUSH+. With his wife Lady Plush, he recently made the short film The Air Catchers for film production company Plush Productions. He recently also launched www.cacaphonique.com as a showcase for his artistic output.

References

External links
 Ben Browton: Biography

English male singers
English punk rock singers
Living people
Year of birth missing (living people)